The 1944 United States presidential election in Maryland took place on November 7, 1944, as part of the 1944 United States presidential election. State voters chose eight representatives, or electors, to the Electoral College, who voted for president and vice president.

Maryland was won by incumbent President Franklin D. Roosevelt (D–New York), running with Senator Harry S. Truman, with 51.85% of the popular vote, against  Governor Thomas E. Dewey (R–New York), running with Governor John Bricker, with 48.15% of the popular vote.

Results

Results by county

Counties that flipped from Democratic to Republican
Allegany
Anne Arundel
Baltimore (County)
Calvert
Caroline
Frederick
Howard
Montgomery
Somerset
St. Mary's
Washington
Worcester

See also
 United States presidential elections in Maryland
 1944 United States presidential election
 1944 United States elections

Notes

References 

Maryland
1944
1944 Maryland elections